Adeline Wong Ching-man (born 9 September 1964) is a businesswoman and a former Hong Kong politician and civil servant who is the former Undersecretary of the Constitutional and Mainland Affairs Bureau from 2009 to 2012. As a retired politician, she currently serves as the chief executive officer of the Chinese Manufacturers' Association of Hong Kong.

Adeline became an Administrative Officer of the Hong Kong Government in 1990. She served as an administrative assistant to former Chief Secretary Rafael Hui prior to his appointment as Undersecretary of the Constitutional and Mainland Affairs Bureau.

References

Place of birth missing (living people)
Government officials of Hong Kong
Hong Kong politicians
Living people
1964 births